Overboard & Down is the fifth EP by indie band Okkervil River, released for their 2006 Australian tour. It is a mix of new material, an old song recorded live, and a Big Star cover ("O, Dana").

Track listing

References

2006 EPs
Okkervil River albums